Each year since 1988 The Critics' Circle has presented an award for Distinguished Service to the Arts, voted for by all members of the Circle, embracing Dance, Drama, Film, Music, Visual Arts and Architecture. This performing arts Award takes the form of an engraved crystal rose bowl, presented at a celebratory luncheon.

Recipients

 1988 Sir Peter Hall
 1989 Dame Ninette de Valois
 1990 Sir Michael Tippett
 1991 Sir David Lean
 1992 Sir John Mills
 1993 Sir Peter Ustinov
 1994 Sir John Drummond
 1995 Sir Peter Wright
 1996 Sir Richard Eyre
 1997 Dame Judi Dench
 1998 Sir Edward Downes
 1999 Harold Pinter
 2000 Dame Alicia Markova
 2001 Paul Scofield
 2002 Sir Alfred Brendel
 2003 Sir Ian McKellen
 2004 Mike Leigh
 2005 Alan Bennett
 2006 Dame Helen Mirren
 2007 Sir Tom Stoppard
 2008 Peter Brook
 2009 Sir Alan Ayckbourn
 2010 Ken Loach
 2011 Stephen Sondheim
 2012 Five Centenary Awards were given to Sir Nicholas Serota, Sir Peter Wright, Sir Colin Davis, Max Stafford-Clark and Danny Boyle
 2013 Grayson Perry
 2014 Sir Nicholas Hytner
 2015 Dame Maggie Smith
 2016 Sir Matthew Bourne
 2017 David Hockney

Notes: The Critics' Circle, the U.K.’s only professional association of critics of drama, music, film, dance and visual arts, is celebrating its centenary in 2013 by awarding Services to the Arts honors for the first time in its history to five key cultural figures who have made a significant impact on the arts, as voted for by members of the five individual sections represented within the circle. Traditionally, the Critics' Circle has made a single award annually since 1988 with theatre director Sir Peter Hall being the first recipient.

References

External links
 The Critics' Circle Awards for Services to the Arts: List of Winners until 2015

1988 establishments in the United Kingdom
Awards established in 1988
Lifetime achievement awards
British performing arts awards